Sister Kate is an American sitcom created by Frank Dungan, Jeff Stein and Tony Sheehan, that aired on NBC from September 16, 1989 to July 30, 1990, during the 1989–1990 television season.

Synopsis
The series stars Stephanie Beacham as Sister Kate, a nun who is transferred (in the pilot episode) to run an orphanage in Chicago. Sister Kate is put in charge of a group of seven unwanted orphans who, due to their scheming ways, have already run off three priests. Story lines involved Sister Kate matching wits with the kids, and the kids' potential adoptions.

Sister Kate premiered on Saturday, September 16, 1989 at 9:30 EST as a sneak preview, and aired regularly at 8:00 EST on Sundays. The low-rated series was canceled after nineteen episodes.

Cast
 Stephanie Beacham as Sister Katherine "Kate" Lambert
 Jason Priestley as Todd Mahaffey
 Erin Reed as April Newberry
 Hannah Cutrona as Frederika "Freddy" Marasco
 Penina Segall as Hilary Logan
 Harley Cross as Eugene Colodren
 Alexaundria Simmons as Violet Johnson
 Joel Robinson as Neville Williams
 Mike Williams as Mr. Beard
 Gordon Jump as Lucas Underwood

Guest Stars 
 Robert Guillaume in episode "Neville's Hired Hand"
 Marion Ross in episode "The Nun" 
 Dan Hedaya in episode "Father Christmas"
 Milli Vanilli in episode "Eugene's Feat"
 Sally Struthers in episode "Sweet Sixteen"

Guest appearances
Rob Pilatus and Fabrice Morvan appeared as Milli Vanilli in the January 7, 1990 episode "Eugene's Feat", speaking a few lines in their natural voices before (what was later revealed to be) lip-synching their hit "Blame It on the Rain".

Theme song
The series theme song, "Maybe An Angel", was performed by contemporary christian music pop star Amy Grant and written by Brian Rawlings and Mason Cooper.

Episodes

Award nominations

References

External links

1989 American television series debuts
1990 American television series endings
1980s American sitcoms
1990s American sitcoms
English-language television shows
Religious comedy television series
Television series about nuns
NBC original programming
Television series by 20th Century Fox Television
Television shows set in Chicago